The Heart of Steel is a documentary directed by Angelo J. Guglielmo, Jr. and had its World Premiere at The Tribeca Film Festival in May, 2006.  Personally selected by festival co-founder, Jane Rosenthal, this historical film chronicles a group of ordinary citizens who volunteered in the search and rescue and cleanup efforts after the collapse of the World Trade Center following the September 11 attacks.

Reviews 

From First Lady Laura Bush:
"President Bush and I are touched by the many creative ways people across the nation have expressed their patriotism and their admiration for the heroes of September 11, 2001. Your video is a wonderful example of that creativity."

From Susan Sarandon:
"In an era where citizens feel helpless and are skeptical as to what kind of a difference a volunteer can really make, Heart of Steel illustrates how even just one impassioned individual can move mountains. An important message for students and patrons alike! What M*A*S*H was to the Vietnam war, The Heart of Steel is to 9/11."

From David Edelstein, New York Magazine:
"Touching."

From Lian Dolan, Satellite Sisters, ABC Radio Networks:
"The Heart of Steel is an extraordinary film about ordinary citizens. I rooted for and cried with this band of renegade volunteers who helped get New York back on its feet after 9/11. What a story! This film should be in every school, every library as a vital part of history."

From Professor Heidi Ardizzone, University of Notre Dame:
"This film is a gripping reflection of the wrenching contradictions of emotion and reaction to 9/11 before the politics of war and global terrorism became the dominant response."

Screenings 

 The White House, Washington, DC
 The Tribeca Film Festival, New York, NY
 The United Nations Headquarters, New York, NY
 The U.S. State Department, New York, NY
 The American Film Festival at the United States Embassy in Moscow, Russia

External links 
 The Heart of Steel Official Website 
 The September 11th Families Association
 Tribute Visitor Center at Ground Zero
 The Tribeca Film Festival

American documentary films
Films based on the September 11 attacks
2006 films
2000s English-language films
2000s American films